Ana Bricia Muro González (born 13 September 1963) is a Mexican psychologist and politician affiliated with the Institutional Revolutionary Party. As of 2014 she served as Senator of the LIX Legislature of the Mexican Congress representing Durango as replacement of Ismael Alfredo Hernandez Deras.

References

1963 births
Living people
Politicians from Durango
People from Durango City
Women members of the Senate of the Republic (Mexico)
Members of the Senate of the Republic (Mexico)
Institutional Revolutionary Party politicians
21st-century Mexican politicians
21st-century Mexican women politicians